The Class EF81 is a six-axle Bo-Bo-Bo wheel arrangement multi-voltage AC/DC electric locomotive type operated on passenger and freight services in Japan since 1968. , 44 locomotives remained in service, operated by JR Freight, JR East, and JR West.

Variants
 EF81-0: Numbers EF81 1 – 152, built 1968–1979
 EF81-300: Numbers EF81 301 – 304, built 1973–1975
 EF81-400: Numbers EF81 401 – 414
 EF81-450: Numbers EF81 451 – 455, built 1991–1992
 EF81-500: Numbers EF81 501 – 503, built 1989
 EF81-600: Former EF81-0 locomotives renumbered by JR Freight from May 2012

EF81-0
152 locomotives were built from 1968 to 1979 in three batches and numbered EF81 1 to EF81 152.
14 EF81-0 locomotives were later modified to become Class EF81-400. The prototype locomotive, EF81 1, was built by Hitachi, and delivered in 1968. Locomotives EF81 137 onward were built with sun-visor plates above the cab windows. These were also subsequently retro-fitted to locomotives EF81 133 to 136.

The prototype, EF81 1, was withdrawn on 31 March 2004.

, 18 Class EF81-0 locomotives remained in service, operated by JR East and JR West.

EF81-300
Four locomotives were built between 1973 and 1975 by Hitachi with unpainted corrugated stainless steel bodies for use on services through the undersea Kanmon Tunnel to Kyushu. In 1978, locomotives EF81 301 and 302 were transferred to the Joban Line, and received the standard JNR AC/DC livery of pale red.

, only one Class EF81-300 locomotive remained in service, EF81 303, operated by JR Freight and based at Moji Depot.

EF81-400
14 locomotives were built in 1986 and 1987 and to replace ageing Class EF30 hauling services through the Kanmon Tunnel. Although some locomotives operating on a few "Blue Train" services served some railway lines in Kyushu, in particular sections of the Kagoshima Main Line and the Nippō Main Line as well as the entire Nagasaki Main Line.

Locomotives EF81 409 to 414 were withdrawn between March 1996 and December 2010.

, three Class EF81-400 locomotives remained in service, EF81 403/404/406, all operated by JR Freight and based at Moji Depot.

EF81-450
Five locomotives built in 1991 and 1992 for use hauling freight services through the Kanmon Tunnel. Locomotives EF81 451 and 452 have modern-style headlight clusters.

, all five Class EF81-450 locomotives remained in service, operated by JR Freight and based at Moji Depot.

EF81-500
Three locomotives, EF81 501 to 503, were built by Hitachi in 1989 for JR Freight for use on freight services along the Sea of Japan coastal route.

, all three Class EF81-500 locomotives remained in service, operated by JR Freight and based at Moji Depot.

EF81-600

, 14 Class EF81-600 locomotives remained in service, operated by JR Freight and based at Moji and Toyama Depots.

Livery variations

In August 2014, JR East Tabata-based locomotive EF81 81 was repainted into a JNR-period imperial train locomotive livery, consisting of "rose pink" (Red No. 13) with silver bodyside stripe.

Preserved examples
, four members of the class are preserved.
 EF81 10: Preserved at the Hakuba Mini Train Park in Hakuba, Nagano (front section only).
 EF81 63: Kept at JR Freight's training centre in Shinagawa, Tokyo. (Not on public display)
 EF81 103: Preserved at the Kyoto Railway Museum in Twilight Express green livery.
 EF81 138: Preserved privately in Chikusei, Ibaraki, since December 2015.

See also
 Japan Railways locomotive numbering and classification

References

1500 V DC locomotives
20 kV AC locomotives
Electric locomotives of Japan
EF81
EF81
EF81
EF81
Bo-Bo-Bo locomotives
1067 mm gauge locomotives of Japan
Railway locomotives introduced in 1968
Hitachi locomotives
Mitsubishi locomotives
Multi-system locomotives